Memorial High School is a public, co-educational secondary school located in Port Arthur, Texas, United States. It was established in August 2002 after a merger of three previous high schools: Thomas Jefferson, Abraham Lincoln, and Stephen F. Austin. Since then, Port Arthur Memorial High School has been the only high school in the Port Arthur Independent School District. It serves most of Port Arthur and a portion of Groves. Initially, the school used the former Lincoln and Jefferson campuses; its new facility opened for the 2009–10 school year on the northern side of Port Arthur. It also has a 9th Grade Center in the Port Acres area of Port Arthur, on the former Austin Middle School campus.

When Thomas Jefferson, Abraham Lincoln and Stephen F. Austin high schools were consolidated, students voted on the name for the new high school and the top two vote-getters were "Memorial High School" and "Thurgood Marshall High School". In September 2007, school board member Terry Doyle suggested renaming Memorial High School after the late Staff Sgt. Lucian Adams, a Port Arthur native who received the Medal of Honor for his bravery in World War II.  Employees of the school district established a museum of artifacts from the three former high schools plus the Catholic Bishop Byrne High School.

Athletics
Memorial High School currently participates in District 22-5A. Memorial participates in the following UIL sports where it has had success in many district championships and playoff wins: 
 Football
 Volleyball
 Cheerleading  
 Cross Country 
 Basketball
 Soccer 
 Track and Field
 Swimming and Diving 
 Baseball
 Softball 
 Tennis 
 Powerlifting
 Golf

Organizations 
Memorial has many organizations including an award winning:

 Marching Band known as "The Marching Heat" 
 Dance/Drill Team known as the "Flames" usually made up of 30-60 girls  
 The Titan Press Newspaper and Yearbook
 NJROTC
 Theatre
 MHS Choir on Fire
Among over 30 clubs.

Notable alumni

 Eric Alexander, former NFL linebacker, attended Stephen F. Austin
 Bun B, rapper and former member of UGK, attended Thomas Jefferson
 Aaron Brown, former NFL defensive end, attended Lincoln
 Jonathan Babineaux, former NFL defensive tackle, attended Lincoln
 Jordan Babineaux, former NFL cornerback, attended Lincoln
 G. W. Bailey (Thomas Jefferson Class of 1961) — stage, television and film actor
 J'Covan Brown (born 1990), basketball player in the Israel Basketball Premier League
 Pimp C, rapper and former member of UGK, attended Lincoln
 Jamaal Charles, former NFL running back
 Todd Dodge (Thomas Jefferson alumni) — a former Texas high school football coach
 Kevin Everett, former NFL tight end, attended Thomas Jefferson
 Goose Gonsoulin, former NFL safety, attended Thomas Jefferson
 Danny Gorrer, former NFL cornerback
 Mike Green, former NFL linebacker, attended Lincoln
 Duriel Harris, former NFL wide receiver, attended Stephen F. Austin
 Xavier Hernandez, former MLB pitcher, attended Thomas Jefferson
 Stephen Jackson, former NBA guard, attended Lincoln
 James Johnson, former NFL running back, attended Thomas Jefferson
 Jimmy Johnson (Thomas Jefferson Class of 1961) — Pro Football Hall of Fame coach, also a college coach
 Paul Jones, professional wrestler
 Janis Joplin (Thomas Jefferson Class of 1960) — A rock, soul, and blues singer and songwriter, member of the Rock and Roll Hall of Fame
 Carl Larpenter, former NFL offensive lineman, attended Thomas Jefferson
 Bobby Leopold, former NFL linebacker, attended Lincoln
 Tim McKyer, former NFL cornerback, attended Lincoln
 Inika McPherson, national champion high jumper
 Marcus Price, former NFL offensive lineman, attended Lincoln
 Elandon Roberts, NFL linebacker
 Dan Rogas, former NFL offensive lineman, attended Thomas Jefferson
 Cotton Speyrer, former NFL wide receiver, attended Thomas Jefferson
 Raymond Strother, political consultant, attended Thomas Jefferson
 Kary Vincent Jr., NFL player
 Joe Washington, former NFL running back, attended Lincoln

References

External links
 Port Arthur ISD

Educational institutions established in 2002
High schools in Jefferson County, Texas
Public high schools in Texas
2002 establishments in Texas